Rachel Owens (born in Atlanta, Georgia, in 1972) is an American artist. She is best known for her multi-media sculptures and installations, which often incorporate a social component. Many of her works are made from crushed glass. She lives and works in New York, NY, and is an assistant professor of art and design at Purchase College, SUNY.

Engaged in broad fields of practice from public art and traditional gallery work to activist based Community Theater, Owens tackles issues of hierarchical social conditions, environmental destruction, consumption and the points where these things intersect. Working sculpturally, performatively and socially, she uses material as meaning: what the sculpture is made of- is what the sculpture means- is what the sculpture does. Bottle shards, cardboard, coal, cut up humvees, and the dust of marble are all used to convey meaning, emotion, and action as they take on forms from porch to iceberg. Often with jobs beyond metaphor, the sculptures become stages, public seating, centers for protest and elevated vantage points.

Owens has been included in exhibitions both in the US and internationally including The X Krasnoyarsk Biennial, RU; Franco Soffiantino Contemporary, IT;  Austrian Cultural Forum, NY; The Frist Museum, TN;  Socrates Sculpture Park, LIC; and the New Museum Window, NY among others.  In February of 2020, her solo museum show, The Hypogean Tip opened at The Housatonic Museum of Art in Bridgeport CT.  She has had reviews and inclusion in publications including The New York Times, The New Yorker, Art in America, Modern Painters, Flash Art and Triple Canopy Anthology, and she has received grants from the Joan Mitchell, Pollack Krasner, and Harpo Foundations as well as a Cultural Humanitarian Grant from the US consulate.  Her work can be found in many collections in the US and abroad, among them; The Beth Rudin Dewoody Collection, The Pritzker Family, Sprint Collection and D. Mullin JR.  Owens is assistant professor of art & design and chair of the sculpture department at SUNY Purchase College.

Education 
Owens received a BFA from the University of Kansas, Lawrence. She received an MFA from the School of the Art Institute of Chicago in 1999.

Exhibitions 
Owens has exhibited internationally.

Solo, 2-person and public representations 
 2020: Hypogean Tip, Housatonic Museum of Art, Bridgeport CT
 2019: Museum of the Cave of the Anthropocene, Untitled, Miami, FL (with Esteban Ocamp-Giraldo)  
 2017: MOTHER, Ziehersmith, NYC, 
 2016: Inveterate Composition for Clare, Purchase College, Purchase, NY (ongoing)
 2015: Smile Always, Ziehersmith and Horton Gallery, NYC
 2013: Almost Antipodeans, BAM Fischer, Brooklyn | Inveterate Composition for Clare, Frist Center for the Arts, Nashville | Soft Edges, Track 13, Nashville
 2012: She's Crafty: Emergency Making Action, New Museum window, NYC
 2011: Inveterate Composition for Clare, Dag Hammarskjöld Park, New York
 2010: Props, ZieherSmith, New York
 2008: Harboring, ZieherSmith, New York
 2007: Wishing Well, presented by ZieherSmith, NADA Art Fair, Miami
 2006: Overthrows, ZieherSmith, New York
 2005: Scatter-Hoarder, ZieherSmith, New York

Select group exhibitions 

 2020: Happy Hardcore, Miriam Gallery, Brooklyn New York 
 2017: Inaugural Exhibition, The Bunker, Collection of Beth Rudin Dewoody, Palm Beach Florida (through 2019) | Dead Horse Bay, Agnes Varis Center for the Arts, Brooklyn, New York Post-Election, September Gallery, Hudson, New York | Double Edged, Circuit 12, Dallas, Texas | It’s Happening: 50 Years of Public Art in NYC Parks | Phillip Johnson Glass House Summer Benefit, New Canaan Connecticut
 2016: Kansas City Artists Coalition: 40 years, Kansas City, Missouri | Brural, Temporary Storage, curated by Ilya Shipolovisch, Brooklyn | 12x12, Black Ball Projects, Brooklyn | Gut Rehab, Realty Collective, Brooklyn (organized and exhibited) 
 2015: Artists at Work, The Cantor Center, Stanford University, Stanford California (through 2016) | Alchemy, DC Moore, NYC | Fall Fete, Momenta Art, Brooklyn, New York 
 2014: Untitled, Ziehersmith and Horton, Miami | Romeo and Juliet, Scenic Designer, Falconworks Production, Brooklyn, New York
 2013: X Krasnoyarsk Biennial, Krasnoyarsk Russia | Creative Time Sandcastle Competition, Klaus Biesenbach judge, Queens
 2012: Next Wave Art, BAM, Brooklyn New York
 2011: BNA, ZieherSmith, Nashville, Tennessee
 2010: Nineteen Eighty-Four, Austrian Cultural Forum, curated by David Harper, Martha Kirszenbaum, & David Komary, New York | Evading Customs_Milan, Le Dictateur, Milan | Knock Knock Who's There? That Joke Isn't Funny Anymore, Armand Bartos Fine Art, New York | 
 2009: Evading Customs, curated by Peter Russo and Lumi Tan, Brown, London | NADA/ART IN/VISIBLE SPACES, 395 Flushing, Brooklyn, New York | Grand Reopening, ZieherSmith, New York  
 Lover, curated by Kate Gilmore and Candice Madey, On Stellar Rays, New York On From Here, Guild and Greyshkul, New York | I Thought Our Worlds Were The Same, Zeitgeist Gallery, Nashville
 2008: New Black, presented by Triplecanopy, Starr Space, Brooklyn, New York
 2007: EFA 2007 Exhibition (Groundswell), Socrates Sculpture Park, Long Island City, New York
 2006: Empathetic, curated by Elizabeth Thomas, Temple Gallery, Philadelphia | Ionesco's Friends, curated Irina Zucca, Francosoffiantino Artecontemporanea, Turin
 2005: No Apology for Breathing, Jack the Pelican Presents, Brooklyn | The Hissing of Summer Lawns, Sara Nightingale Gallery, Watermill, New York
 2004: Some Exhaust, Lehmann Maupin Gallery, New York | Postcards from the Edge, Brent Sikkema Gallery, New York | Andy Warhol’s Living Room, Sara Nightingale Gallery, Watermill, New York | Falling in Love with the Jailer’s Daughter, Project Green, Brooklyn, New York
 2003: Brooklyn Underground Film Festival, DUMBO, Brooklyn, New York | Talent Show, Project Green, Brooklyn, New York | Occurrences: The Performative Aspects of Video, Betty Rymer Gallery, Chicago
 2002: One Day, In a Day, Everyday, part of Sans, APEX art, New York (curated by Mira Schor) | New Homes for America Under Construction, Weather Records, Brooklyn, New York | Parallel Sensations, Williamsburg Art and Historical Center, Brooklyn, New York 
 2000: Hit and Run 4, New York curated by Edward Winkelman

Public commissions 
 The Hypogean Tip, Housatonic Museum of Art, Bridgeport CT,  2020
 Life on the Other Side of a Broken Glass Ceiling, NYC Parks Department, 2017
 Machinations, Yeltsin Center, Performance commissioned by US Consulate Moscow, 2016
 Almost Antipodeans, X Krasnoyarsk Biennial, commissioned by BAM and Mikhail Prokhorov Foundation, 2013
 Skin (US), Brooklyn Academy of Music, 2012
 Inveterate Composition for Clare, NYC Parks Department, 2011
 Privet, Austrian Cultural Forum, 2010
 Groundswell, Socrates Sculpture Park, 2007
 Wishing Well, NADA Art Fair, Miami 2007

Awards and recognition  
Owens' work has been discussed in the New York Times, Art in America, Hyperallergic, Urban Glass, Sculpture Magazine, and the Village Voice, among other publications. She has received grants from the Joan Mitchell Foundation, the Pollock-Krasner Foundation, the Harpo Foundation, and the United States Embassy in Russia.

Catalogues and publications 
The Hypogean Tip, with essays from Robbin Zella, Maisa Tisdale and Stamatina Gregory, Housatonic Museum of Art February 2020

Gut Rehab, newspaper project in conjunction with exhibition, with contributions from Adam Helms, Scott Zieher, Ilya Shipilovitch, Mira Schor

F15, publication as part of Smile Always at Ziehersmith Gallery, NYC 2015 Kraznoyarsk Biennial, essay from Anna Tolstova 2013

Invalid Format: Triple Canopy Anthology, vol. 1, 2012

Nineteen Eighty-Four, Austrian Cultural Forum, essay by David Harper 2010 EAF 2007, Socrates Sculpture Park, essay from Alyson Baker, 2007

References

External links 
 Talk at the Frist Art Museum
 Mother at ZieherSmith
 Faculty Profile at Purchase College, SUNY 

American women sculptors
Living people
1972 births
21st-century American sculptors
21st-century American women artists
20th-century American women artists
20th-century American sculptors
American glass artists
Women glass artists
American installation artists